The 2015–16 Liga Națională was the 58th season of Liga Națională, the top-level men's professional handball league. The league comprises fourteen teams. CSM București were the defending champions.

Teams for season 2015–16

League table

Pld – Played; W – Won; D – Drawn; L – Lost; GF – Goals for; GA – Goals against; Diff – Difference; Pts – Points.

Season statistics

Number of teams by counties

Romenian clubs in European competitions
Women's EHF Champions League

CSM București

 FINAL 4
Semifinal:[CSM]-[Vardar Skopje]: 27–21; 
1-2 Places:[CSM]-[Győr]: 29-26

HCM Baia Mare

Women's EHF Cup

ASC Corona 2010 Brașov

H.C.M. Roman

Women's EHF Cup Winners' Cup
SC Municipal Craiova

External links
 Official website

Liga Națională (women's handball)
2015–16 domestic handball leagues
2015 in Romanian women's sport
2016 in Romanian women's sport